No 73, later retitled 7T3, is a British 1980s children's TV show produced by Television South (TVS) for the ITV network. It was broadcast live on Saturday mornings and ran from 1982 to 1988. The show had an ensemble cast amongst others, Sandi Toksvig, Neil Buchanan, Andrea Arnold, Kim Goody and Kate Copstick.

When Television South won the contract to provide ITV coverage for the South of England in 1980, the first thing they set up was a children's department. A team put together with a background in theatre and drama, soon decided to produce a Saturday morning show that differed from the usual Tiswas and Saturday Superstore formula: This show would feature actors in character as hosts, performing their own comedic storyline around the usual guests, music videos, competitions and cartoons. Much of the show was improvised and a whole week of rehearsals plus an extensive dress rehearsal on Friday preceded each live broadcast on Saturday morning.

Series

First series: January–February 1982

No 73 opened its door to the public for the first time on 2 January 1982 at 11am, but only as a regional programme in the South and South East of England (much of the ITV network continued to carry Tiswas). Ethel Davis (Sandi Toksvig), an eccentric old lady who progressively got younger as the show went on, owned the place. Harry Stern (Nick Staverson) was introduced as her bumbling nephew. Dawn Lodge (Andrea Arnold), the roller-boot-wearing female lodger, quickly became the go-to person for the animal spot with international vet David Taylor. Most eccentric of all, Patrick Doyle appeared as Percy Simmonds, inventor and love interest to Ethel. Each episode ended with Ethel hosting the ("daring, dazzling, death-defyingly dull, devastatingly dangerous, delectable, delicatestible, divinely decadent") Sandwich Quiz, a madcap-general knowledge game pitting two of that week's guests against each other.

Second series: June - August 1982

The show returned on 5 June 1982, still being broadcast from Southampton studios and only shown to TVS viewers. Neil Buchanan had unofficially joined the cast as the resident caricaturist and another major cast member, Kim Goody, first appeared this season performing at the TVS theatre in Gillingham, where Percy held a job as handyman. Neighbours Martin and Hazel Edwards (Richard Addison and Jeannie Crowther) from No 75 also started to figure into the storyline, usually with Martin being at odds with Ethel.

Third series: April–August 1983

Now broadcast across all the ITV regions, except TSW, the production moved to TVS's new Maidstone studios, changing postcodes (though the house remained the same) and Percy was now supposed to be his own Scottish cousin Alec, enabling Patrick Doyle to speak with his own accent. This did not stop him from leaving at the end of this series. In this series, Sandi and the resident inventor, Tony English, created the Hover Cupboard and later tested it out at sea travelling from Southampton to Cowes on the Isle of Wight.

Fourth series: Summer 1984

New regular visitors (i.e. cast members) included Fred the Postman (Tony Aitken) – who had a thing for Ethel for a while, Tony Deal (Nick Wilton) – the local confidence trickster always trying to sell Ethel everything and anything, and Eazi Target (Tony Hippolyte) – Ethel's friend from her days at the paper. With Colin Daly holding his Supersleuth competition over several episodes dressed like Sherlock Holmes, there was certainly no shortage of silly-looking characters around. Meanwhile, Dawn had her rollerboots spraypainted by Paul King (as per King's music video "Love and Pride").

Fifth series: February–July 1985

Ethel started running a Bed and Breakfast in this series and held the memorable matchbox competition to see who could cram the most objects into one tiny matchbox (the winner somehow managed to fit in 73 items). While Fred and Eazi left the series after failing to start a radiostation in the backyard shed (aptly named "Radio Shed"), Ethel fell in love with her most unlikely suitor yet, bank manager Frederick Crossfield (Michael Maynard). The courtship lasted two episodes, with the series finale leading up to the wedding and a cliffhanger.
All the cast members (save Maynard) got the chance to act out countless different characters in three different pun-laden serials, produced by "Front Door productions"

Sixth series: January–April 1986

It turned out the wedding was cancelled by mutual agreement at the very last moment. With the failure of a show called "TX", No 73 returned a month earlier than planned. There was no new 'Front Door Production', instead Neil and Kim held a treasure hunt across three counties to win the spare 'box room'. Kim won, but ended up sharing the room with Dawn, while Neil bunked up with Harry. By the end of the series the two rivals had fallen in love. Tony Deal appeared in two memorable episodes, first on the run from the police and then trying to lure the guest to No 75 with Martin Edwards, but disappeared by the end of the series.

Seventh series: September 1986 – April 1987

The show was rescheduled to the winter season, with the location bound Saturday morning show Get Fresh taking over summer duties. It was revealed in passing that Ethel had emigrated to Australia to live with her cousin, leaving Harry, Dawn, Neil and Kim collectively in charge. The Sandwich Quiz was replaced by the 'Duster Muster', the winner of which got to clean the house on Saturday afternoon. There was also a new serial, spoofing The A-Team, called 'The Z-Team'. Former member of Copy Cats Andrew O'Connor moved in, while Scottish housekeeper Maisie McConachie (Kate Copstick) became the new resident klutz. Martin introduced his nephew Geoffrey (Nicolas Barnes), but none of these three stuck around for the next series. At the end of November the gang started introducing a line-up of children's programmes on Sunday morning, which developed into "Sunday at 73" by January. This was a shorter, less elaborate version of the show, with fewer guests and more breaks for cartoon. The new and evil landlord, J.C. Birch (Bill Steward) started threatening to demolish not only No 73, but the entire neighbourhood and replace them with luxury flats. Despite the emergence of Rob 'The Builder' Debenham who came in to help put the house back in order it started to crumble down around its inhabitants. The series finale had Rob 'The Builder' Debenham crashing through the bathroom floor into the lounge and Martin Edwards losing his mind. Both Martin and Hazel left the series at this point. Rob Debenham remained to help create the 7T3 park that the house moved to in the next series.

On 7 March 1987, the day after the sinking of the Herald of Free Enterprise, when breaking off for a news report on the disaster, a humorous caption read "sea you later", unwittingly giving the impression of callousness.

Eighth series: September 1987 – March 1988 (as 7T3 from January 1988)

More new characters seemed to join the household each week, including Julian Callaghan, American Nadia de Lemeny and Rob 'the builder' Debenham who played an out of work actor making extra money by moonlighting as a builder. There's no connection between this Rob 'The builder' and subsequent Bob the builder TV series. The eccentric Hamilton Dent (Richard Waites) moved into No 75. Harry premiered his latest and last film epic, "From Flusher with love". J.C. Birch finally saw fit to tear down the entire street and build a Wild West theme park in January, and from then on the show was called "7T3". This development saw the entire cast move into a Western saloon, with the numbers 7 and 3 painted on each saloon door, and a brass fixtures forming the shape of a 'T' when closed, hence the new title, and had them run around a mock Western town (in winter) with the same musical guests and dancers. It only lasted until March 1988. The next September saw the premiere of a more traditional Saturday morning show called Motormouth; presenters included Tony Gregory, Neil Buchanan, Gaby Roslin and Caroline Hanson as well as using part of the 7T3 set.

Front Door Productions

Front Door Productions was a fictional production company located in Maidstone, Kent and founded by Ethel Davis (Sandi Toksvig) in January 1985 to produce serials in five to six parts starring herself and all the regulars from the Saturday morning children's variety programme No 73. Local shop keeper Mr Pattels gave the residents of No 73 a special offer on developing their Super 8 home movies, and even went to the trouble of editing the scenes together. Ethel and the rest made all the costumes, built all the sets and played every part.

In reality of course, TVS Television provided the sets and costumes, while Sandi Toksvig and Nick Symons wrote the pun-infested scripts. The regulars did play every part though. There were five major Front Door Productions, all of which can only be described as 'spoofs'. Broadcast as part of No 73s Saturday morning line-up, the 1985 season featured three in a row, while the two following years only had one each.

"Roman Around"
This first production starred Ethel (Sandi Toksvig), Harry (Nick Staverson), Dawn (Andrea Arnold) and Neil (Neil Buchanan) in an epic set in ancient Rome (but filmed in Hever Castle, Kent). Between the four of them they played up to 34 different parts. Clearly the aim was to create a less smutty version of the classic Carry On movies.

"How many for dinner?"
Having missed out of the first production, four other prominent members of the revolving No 73 cast got a 1920s murder mystery of their own, inspired by, if not exactly written by Agatha Christie. Kim (Kim Goody), Martin (Richard Addison), Hazel (Jeannie Crowther) and Fred (Tony Aitken) divided all speaking parts between them, though they started off with considerably fewer characters than the Roman production, and the cast-list predictably grew slimmer by the episode.

"The Three Musketeers"
(1 June 1985 – 29 June 1985) An extremely loose adaptation of the Alexandre Dumas novel, Ethel, Tony Deal (Nick Wilton) and Eazi (Tony Hippolyte) starred as the titular musketeers, Athos, Bathos and Pathos as well as every other character (though some of the horses were not portrayed by them).
This five-parter was shown over the last five episodes of the fifth series, and with three serials to one series, every cast member got a chance to show his or her versatility (and almost all of them had to play different sexes at one point or another).

"The Z-Team"
(20 September 1986 – 25 October 1986) Convicted as toddlers of a crime they did not commit, Corporal Tom "Cannibal" Stiff (Neil), Dimpleton 'Skates' Wreck (Dawn), Marginally Mental Murky (Kim) and Mr. P as B.A. Brat (Harry) are still on the run from the Parks Department. Police 5's Shaw Taylor appeared in the first and last chapter as kidnap victim of the evil Pirates (also played by Neil, Dawn, Kim and Harry). Both teams were hunted (for different reasons) by Agent Perkus (Martin) and social worker Mrs Goose (Hazel). In the finale it was revealed that Perkus and Goose were actually the parents of both the Z-Team and the Pirates.

"From Flusher with love"
(3 October 1987 – 7 November 1987) Written and directed by Harry and starring Dawn as a female spy called Janice Bond (agent 0073). This Bond took her orders from 'Erm' as opposed to 'M', who had a male secretary called Spendapenny. Gadgets were provided by 'Cue'. A love interest was provided in the form of American counterpart Aaron Dreck. Harry himself appeared as Tony Toogood.

References

External links
 
 
 No. 73 on Paul Morris' SatKids
 No 73 on the BFI Film & TV Database
 Sites.google.com

ITV children's television shows
1980s British children's television series
1982 British television series debuts
1988 British television series endings
Television shows produced by Television South (TVS)
English-language television shows